Dress to Kill may refer to:

 Dress to Kill (Eddie Izzard), a 1998 stand-up comedy performance video by Eddie Izzard
 Dress to Kill (2Cents album), 2009
 Dress to Kill (After School album), 2014

See also 
 Dressed to Kill (disambiguation)